David Wellington (born 1971) is an American writer of horror fiction, best known for his Zombie trilogy. He also writes science fiction as D. Nolan Clark.

Biography

Wellington was born in Pittsburgh, Pennsylvania. He attended Syracuse University and received an MFA in creative writing from Penn State. He also holds a master's degree in Library Science from the Pratt Institute. He now lives in New York City.

He made his debut as a comic book writer on Marvel Zombies Return: Iron Man. His novel The Last Astronaut was nominated for the 2020 Arthur C. Clarke Award.

Published works

Monster trilogy
The Monster novels involve a global zombie apocalypse and describe how humanity has been reduced to tiny pockets of existence. 
Monster Island
Monster Nation
Monster Planet

Vampire series
Wellington's vampire novels follow a Pennsylvania state trooper battling a centuries-old vampire.
13 Bullets (2006 online serialization; 2007 print)
99 Coffins (2007)
Vampire Zero (2008)
23 Hours (2009)
32 Fangs (published April 2012)

Werewolf series
Wellington's werewolf novels are set in remote Arctic Canada. The series follows werewolves who are being hunted to extinction by humans. 
Frostbite was published on October 6, 2009. The web serialization can be found at Wellington's website.
Overwinter was released on September 14, 2010.

Plague Zone

Plague Zone is a zombie novel set in the state of Washington.<ref>{{Cite web |url=http://www.davidwellington.net/serials/plague-zone/chapters/1-2/ |title=Zone |access-date=2012-03-22 |archive-url=https://web.archive.org/web/20120221024048/http://www.davidwellington.net/serials/plague-zone/chapters/1-2/ |archive-date=2012-02-21 |url-status=dead }}</ref> It is completed in serial online, but not yet published in print. (Online serialization. Went to Kindle September 2012)

Jim Chapel missions

 Chimera (2013)
 "Minotaur" (2013 e-book)
 "Myrmidon" (2013 e-book)
 The Hydra Protocol (2014)
 The Cyclops Initiative (2016)

The Silence trilogy (as D. Nolan Clark)
The first novel, Forsaken Skies, was reviewed by Kirkus Reviews as containing "the usual complications, heroics, and surprises (...), all professionally packaged and produced and entirely unmemorable".Forsaken Skies (2016), Forgotten Worlds (2017), Forbidden Suns (2017), 

Other novels
 The Last Astronaut (2019), 

Short stories

"Chuy and the Fish" in The Undead: Zombie Anthology (Oct. 2005, Permuted Press)
"Cyclopean" in The Undead: Skin and Bones (Aug. 2007, Permuted Press)
"Twilight in the Green Zone" in Exotic Gothic (2007, Ash-Tree Press, ed. Danel Olson). Click for Podcast by author. 
"Grvnice" in Exotic Gothic 2 (2008, Ash-Tree Press, ed. Danel Olson). 
"Off Radio" in Buried Tales of Pinebox, TX (June 2009, 12 to Midnight)
"Atacama" in Exotic Gothic 4 (May 2012, PS Publishing, ed. Danel Olson)
"The Man With The Fractal Tattoo", Whose Future is It?, chapter 3 (2018)
"The Passenger", Whose Future is It?'', chapter 11 (2018)

References

External links

1971 births
Living people
21st-century American novelists
American fantasy writers
American horror novelists
American male novelists
Pratt Institute alumni
Pennsylvania State University alumni
Syracuse University alumni
Writers from New York City
Writers from Pittsburgh
American male short story writers
21st-century American short story writers
21st-century American male writers
Novelists from New York (state)
Novelists from Pennsylvania